Hidy and Howdy were the official mascots of the 1988 Winter Olympics in Calgary, Alberta, Canada. They were anthropomorphic twin polar bears who wore western/cowboy style outfits. Students of Bishop Carroll High School in Calgary were used as performers during Hidy and Howdy's four years as the mascots of the XVth Olympic Winter Games. After the Closing Ceremonies, they retired from public life, only ever reappearing once for the filming of the 1993 movie Cool Runnings for a brief cameo appearance, since the film is based on the Calgary Olympics.

Hidy and Howdy were also featured on various "Welcome To Calgary" signs located throughout the city of Calgary, but in 2008 the local government had the signs removed and "respectfully transported" to Canada Olympic Park where they are now kept, in turn ending the duo's iconic place in the city.

References 

1988 Winter Olympics
Olympic mascots
Bear mascots
Fictional polar bears
Canadian mascots
Fictional characters from Alberta